Adaghas is a small town and rural commune in Essaouira Province of the Marrakesh-Safi region of Morocco.

Population 
At the time of the 2004 census, the commune had a total population of 3321 people living in 559 households.

References

Populated places in Essaouira Province
Rural communes of Marrakesh-Safi